WNRV is a Bluegrass formatted broadcast radio station licensed to Narrows-Pearisburg, Virginia, serving Narrows and Giles County, Virginia.  WNRV is owned and operated by New River Interactive Media, LLC.

References

External links
 WNRV AM 990 The Ridge

NRV
Country radio stations in the United States
Radio stations established in 1952